Ceylon Post and Telegraph Signals Corps was a departmental corps of the Ceylon Defense Force from 1943 to 1945 and of the Ceylon Volunteer Force 1955 to 1956. It was formed in February 1946, from the Post and Telegraph Signals Unit of the Ceylon Engineers Corps. It was disbanded following the disbanding of the Ceylon Defence Force on 11 April 1949 and formation of the Ceylon Army by Army Act No. 17 of 1949 which revoked the Ceylon Defence Force Ordinance of 1910. The corps was reformed in 1955 with staff from the Department of Post and Ceylon Telegraph Department. The government hoped to minimized the effects to the Post and Telegraph services in the event of trade union action (strikes were common) by mobilizing the personnel attached to this unit. However it was disbanded in 1956 when the leftist S.W.R.D. Bandaranaike became prime minister.

See also 
 General Post Office, Colombo
 Postage stamps and postal history of Sri Lanka
 Sri Lanka Post

References 

Disbanded regiments of the Sri Lankan Army
Military units and formations established in 1955
Military units and formations disestablished in 1956
Postal system of Sri Lanka
1955 establishments in Ceylon
1956 disestablishments in Ceylon
Sri Lanka Army Volunteer Force